My Wrongs #8245–8249 & 117 is a 2002 British short film written and directed by Chris Morris, starring Paddy Considine as a mentally disturbed man taking care of a friend's Doberman Pinscher (named Rothko, and voiced by Morris) while she is away. The dog talks to him and convinces him that he is on trial for everything he has done wrong in his life, and the dog is his lawyer.

This was the first film by Warp Films, an imprint of British record label Warp Records. It was released on DVD in 2003, on a region 0, PAL disc. The disc featured a false commentary track, among other bonuses. The packaging included a list of various wrongs committed by the protagonist, although one would have to destroy the case to read them all. The title comes from this tendency of the protagonist to record his sins: the film depicts numbers 8245–8249 in the timeline, and number 117, which was an unguarded comment made as a small boy, in a flashback.

Plot
The protagonist (Paddy Considine) is a man tasked with looking after his friend Imogen's house, and is instructed to take her dog Rothko for walks, but not to let him off the leash. After putting Imogen's keys through the mail slot in her door (so they do not get lost), the man ensures that he will not lose Rothko by tying the dog's leash around his own neck. Rothko leads him to a park, where he viciously attacks and kills a duck in front of onlookers. As they shout at the man, Rothko (Chris Morris) begins to speak to him, taunting him.

The pair run away onto a bus, where the dog tells the man that he is his lawyer and is defending everything the man has ever done wrong. The man recalls a time where he was spoken to similarly by a gerbil as a child, telling him his father was cheating on his mother. The man and dog are kicked off the bus after the conductor finds out the man has no money.

The dog, enticed by a little girl's used handkerchief, follows her into a church, dragging the man with him. Inside, a christening is going on, and the dog tells the man he has brought him here for forgiveness for what he is about to do. The baby being christened speaks to the man, telling him to speak up and tell everyone in attendance that the priest is a paedophile and the baby's mother is a prostitute. Urged on by Rothko, the man does so, only for the baby to say, "Only joking!"

In the resulting commotion, the priest is knocked over, the baby is sent flying, and Rothko breaks free. The man catches the baby and chases Rothko out of the church, only to see the dog struck by a vehicle. The dying dog tells the man that he should now seek out legal counsel from the baby before he dies. When the man asks to speak to the baby, the baby's father punches him.

In a closing monologue, the man reveals he left a note to Imogen apologizing for the keys and dog, and imagines her being satisfied with it, but he is sure she is not. He no longer goes to the park, as he hears the ducks tell passers-by that he thought a dog could talk, and they refuse to stop when he tells them to.

Production
The short film was based on a monologue from Chris Morris' earlier radio programme Blue Jam, and was attempted as a sketch in the television adaptation Jam. The sketch was omitted from Jam, but very short clips were edited into the TV series (there are small sections before the last sketches in episodes 1 and 6, showing the man running after the dog, with the leash around his neck). The film omits a scene from the monologue in which the protagonist tries to order food for Rothko at a cafe, and changes Rothko from an Irish wolfhound to a Doberman pinscher. A couple of actors featured in Jam appear in cameo form and uncredited - Mark Heap is seen as a park warden, while Kevin Eldon is the man's father in a flashback.

In 2003, the film won a BAFTA for best short film.

External links
 
 
 DVD Times review

2002 films
2002 short films
British short films
Films about dogs
2000s English-language films